Callitris canescens is a species of conifer in the family Cupressaceae. It is found only in Australia.

References

canescens
Pinales of Australia
Least concern flora of Australia
Flora of South Australia
Flora of Western Australia
Taxonomy articles created by Polbot